Luzan is a surname. Notable people include:

 Ignacio de Luzán (1702–1754) Spanish critic and poet
 José Luzán (1710–1785), Spanish painter
 Liudmyla Luzan (born 1997), Ukrainian sprint canoeist
 Yelyzaveta Luzan (born 2003), Ukrainian-born Azerbaijani gymnast

See also